"Do Ya" is the debut single of the Danish pop duo Anthony Jasmin, winners of the seventh season of the Danish version of X Factor. The English language song was their winners song in the finale of the show on 28 March 2014. The song, immediately released after the results were announced, peaked on the Tracklisten the official Danish Singles Chart at number 1.

Charts

References

Danish reality television series
Number-one singles in Denmark
2014 debut singles
2014 songs
Sony Music singles
Songs written by Engelina